Owen Davidson and Billie Jean King successfully defended their title, defeating Mark Farrell and Lesley Charles in the final, 6–3, 9–7 to win the mixed doubles tennis title at the 1974 Wimbledon Championships.

Seeds

  Owen Davidson /  Billie Jean King (champions)
  Jimmy Connors /  Chris Evert (third round, withdrew)
  Alex Metreveli /  Olga Morozova (quarterfinals)
  Kim Warwick /  Evonne Goolagong (quarterfinals)

Draw

Finals

Top half

Section 1

Section 2

Section 3

Section 4

Bottom half

Section 5

Section 6

Section 7

Section 8

References

External links

1974 Wimbledon Championships – Doubles draws and results at the International Tennis Federation

X=Mixed Doubles
Wimbledon Championship by year – Mixed doubles